The 2004–05 season was Stoke City's 98th season in the Football League and the 38th in the second tier, it was also the first season in the new re-branded Football League Championship.

With supporter expectation now rising there were hopes that Stoke could soon begin to mount a serious attempt to return to the top flight. But after a poor summer in terms of transfer activity those hopes subsided, but soon returned after a good start to the season with Stoke going top of the table in early September. But any hopes of a promotion push soon vanished with some poor performances and most notably a lack of goals being scored. In fact Stoke went on a dull run of 'binary' results, from 23 October 2004 to 22 February 2005 the only score line was that of 0–0, 1–0, 0–1 and 1–1. Supporters began to vent their anger at the lack of entertainment on offer as the side fell into mid-table obscurity and a final finish of 12th the outcome of a forgettable season.

Season review

League
Prior to the start of the season the Football League went through a re-branding process with the First Division been renamed the Football League Championship. Stoke had a poor summer in the transfer market with only Dave Brammer and Steve Simonsen joining the club before the start of the season. However these worries were forgotten with a fine pre-season victory over Spanish giants Valencia. Stoke began the 2004–05 season very well beating promotion favourites Wolverhampton Wanderers 2–1 on the opening day. Victories over Gillingham, Cardiff City and Derby County followed and after a thrilling win over Ipswich Town Stoke went top of the table.

However Stoke then lost their form and went seven matches without a win before beating Millwall 1–0 on Halloween. Prior to that on 22 October Stoke drew 1–1 away at Leicester City a result which sparked a dull run of results. Through until 22 February the only score line was that of 0–0, 1–0, 0–1 and 1–1 which saw manager Tony Pulis come under heavy criticism from supporters form the lack of attacking football and entertainment on offer. New signings again failed to arrive with Michael Duberry from Leeds United and Lewis Buxton from Portsmouth the only mainstays from a series of loans, however both players were defenders. Ade Akinbiyi was sold to Burnley despite there being a lack of goalscoring. The 'binary' run of results finally ended with a 3–2 win over Leicester City which prompted an upturn in results but any hopes of a late push for a play-off place was ended with an awful defeat at home to rock bottom Rotherham United.

FA Cup
Stoke drew Premier League side Arsenal away in the third round and took the lead through Wayne Thomas. But Stoke could not hold out and Arsenal scored twice to go through 2–1.

League Cup
Stoke made another poor exit in the first round losing against League One side Oldham Athletic.

Final league table

Results
Stoke's score comes first

Legend

Pre-Season Friendlies

Football League Championship

FA Cup

League Cup

Squad statistics

References

Stoke City F.C. seasons
Stoke City